Ecological grief (or eco-grief), also known as climate grief, refers to the sense of loss that arises from experiencing or learning about environmental destruction or climate change. Environmental grief can be defined as "the grief reaction stemming from the environmental loss of ecosystems by natural and man-made events." Another definition is "the grief felt in relation to experienced or anticipated ecological losses, including the loss of species, ecosystems, and meaningful landscapes due to acute or chronic environmental change." For example, scientists witnessing the decline of Australia's Great Barrier Reef report experiences of anxiety, hopelessness, and despair.

Environmental disruption, such as the loss of biodiversity, or even the loss of inanimate environmental features like sea ice, cultural landscapes, or historic heritage can also cause negative psychological responses, such as ecological grief or Solastalgia.

Background and characteristics 
Usage of "ecological grief" dates back to at least 1940, where Aldo Leopold used the term to refer to the pain of environmental loss.  In  A Sand County Almanac, Leopold wrote that “One of the penalties of an ecological education is to live alone in a world of wounds”.  The phenomena of ecological grief became more widespread in the 21st century along with the worsening climate crisis. 

In 2018, Cunsolo and Ellis wrote that "grief is a natural and legitimate response to ecological loss, and one that may become more common as climate impacts worsen."

A 2020 survey by the American Psychological Association found that more than two-thirds of American adults said they had experienced "eco-anxiety". The emerging model of climate grief suggests that people may process climate despair, or climate anxiety, through the stages of grief, and that forming social support networks is a part of this process.

Australian philosopher Glenn Albrecht coined the term solastalgia, publishing the first academic paper on the idea in 2005. The term is derived from word root solacium (meaning "comfort") and the suffix -algia (meaning "pain"), suggesting a loss of comfort, and akin to the terms climate grief, ecological grief, and environmental melancholia. A 2022 article in The Atlantic described solastalgia as a response to "losing your home while staying in one place". The article said the word "seemed to tap into a kind of angst about life on a warming planet", the word inspiring an instrumental music track in the U.K., an album in Slovenia, and a porcelain representation.

Climate communicators may focus initially on communicating climate impacts and adaptation rather than the aspects of grief. Communicators such as the Yale Program on Climate Change Communication have often addressed the question of grief by stressing the importance of describing solutions. Attempting to channel climate anxiety into action for solutions is consistent with the approach described by Sherman H. Dryer, Director of Radio Productions at The University of Chicago, in his manual for World War II propaganda, in which radio communications about the war always end with a message on how the listener can support the war effort.

However, it is not clear that encouragement to channel anxiety and despair into action is an adequate response for people who have experienced concrete personal losses, such as Greenlanders who have had to euthanize sled dogs. Cunsolo, an ecologist active in Nunatsiavut, in Canada's Far North, described grappling with this question in an article titled, "To Grieve or Not to Grieve?".

Some discussions in the media have focused on the question of whether presenting the negative aspects of climate change is making people despair and give up. A 2016 Scientific American article posed the question, "Is a traumatic sense of loss freezing action against climate change?" In 2019, journalist Mike Pearl asserted that "people are suffering from what could be called 'climate despair,' a sense that climate change is an unstoppable force that will render humanity extinct and renders life in the meantime futile." More recently, research has indicated that emotional responses to crisis and disaster are inherently adaptive and with appropriate support in reflecting on and processing the experiences, these emotions can lead to resilience.

Impacts
On April 14, 2018, civil rights attorney David Buckel, 60, self-immolated without witnesses at about 6 a.m. in a Brooklyn, N.Y. park, after having sent an email notifying news organizations. His suicide letter recited, "My early death by fossil fuel reflects what we are doing to ourselves" and "Here is a hope that giving a life might bring some attention to the need for expanded action."

On April 22, 2022—Earth Day—Wynn Bruce, 50, self-immolated in front of the U.S. Supreme Court Building apparently to protest climate inaction, after having edited a comment on a 2021 Facebook post about a course on climate change, writing "4/22/2022" next to a fire emoji.

Groups of people affected more than average

Young people 
In an open letter to the Swedish government, a group of psychologists and psychotherapists said, "A continued ecological crisis without an active solution focus from the adult world and decision makers poses a great risk that an increasing number of young people are affected by anxiety and depression."

A Boston University publication, The Brink, quotes a graduate student who "studied the collapse of Amazonian rain forests" and recommends a  supportive approach, of time in nature and community, self care, and appreciation for small daily efforts on climate. One advocacy group manager says, "Those of us who work in the climate change world see young people mourning the losses that are coming ... These reactions are real and valid."

Renee Lertzman, a social scientist who "studies the mental health and emotional components of environmental degradation ... likens the climate-related stress now plaguing teenagers and 20-somethings to the oppressive Cold War fears that gripped young baby boomers, many of whom came of age under the threat of nuclear annihilation."

Scientists 
Scientists who study climate change and biodiversity loss have formed support groups online and at institutions to help with dealing with ecological grief. Many scientists have seen the impact of climate change and biodiversity loss first hand often over very short periods of time.

"I'd just recruited a PhD student to study fish behaviour, and between the time of recruiting him and getting out for the first field season, the Great Barrier Reef died – 80% of the corals where we work were gone, and most of the fish that lived there also moved on. I told him in the interview that his visit was going to be this most wonderful experience, and it was just a tragic graveyard of historic coral reef life" Steve Simpson Professor of marine biology and global change at the University of Exeter.

Scientists internalise their emotions, move to other fields of work, work on protecting parts of the environment they study or shift to finding ways to help the environment adapt. Some scientists see the need for new rituals to celebrate their love for the environment.

Indigenous communities 
Indigenous communities may have grief over loss of identity because it is so closely connected to the environment and the knowledge that the environment will degrade further. Also the sadness of watching others experience environment related trauma which they have also experienced.

"We are people of the sea ice. And if there's no more sea ice, how do we be people of the sea ice?" Inuit elder.

Relationship with worldview 
People express differing intensities of concern and grief about climate change depending on their worldview, with those holding egoistic (defined as people who mostly care about oneself and their health and wellbeing), social-altruistic (defined as people who express concern for others in their community like future generations, friends, family and general public) and biospheric (defined as people who are concerned about environmental aspects like plants and animals) views differing markedly. People who belong to the biospheric group expressed the most concern about ecological stress/grief i.e., a form of grief related to worries about the state of the world's environment, and engage in ecological coping, – ecological coping includes connection to community, expression of sorrow and grief, shifting focus to controllable aspects of climate change and being close to nature  – people who belonged to the social-altruistic group engaged in ecological coping but did not express ecological stress.

As a secondary impact of climate adaptation on women 
Grief may be directly associated with the secondary impacts of climate adaptation. These secondary impacts have been observed in women according to the IPCC.

The IPCC AR5 WG2 TS notes that "Women often experience additional duties as laborers and caregivers as a result of extreme weather events and climate change, as well as responses (e.g., male outmigration), while facing more psychological and emotional distress, reduced food intake, adverse mental health outcomes due to displacement, and in some cases increasing incidences of domestic violence. [9.3, 9.4, 12.4, 13.2, Box CC-GC]" (see section numbers in full report for more in depth coverage).

See also 

Anticipatory grief
Eco-anxiety
Effects of climate change on mental health
Five Years (David Bowie song)
Nuclear anxiety
Solastalgia

References

External links 

 What is Climate Grief?, a review article by Climate & Mind
 How Climate Change Affects your Mental Health, TED Talk by Britt Wray
Climate Psychiatry Alliance

Grief
Environmental psychology
Climate change and society